Pequop or Pequop Siding is a ghost town in Elko County, Nevada, United States. It was located west of Toano on the route around the north end of the Pequop Mountains between Cobre and Wells. It was first a stop station of the Central Pacific Railroad and later a non-agency station on the Southern Pacific Railroad. Several buildings were erected to house section crews.

History
In November, 1870, Pequop siding was the site of the second robbery of the same train. The train was first robbed near Verdi, Nevada of about  payroll intended for Virginia City. The robbers turned out to be deserters from Camp Halleck. One of the robbers was Edward Carr, who three weeks before the robbery had murdered Sally Whitmore, the madam of a brothel near Camp Halleck. One of Carr's gloves was found at the site of the robbery.

The end of the village was in the 1940s, when the introduction of diesel in locomotives made Pequop obsolete.

References

External links

Ghost towns in Elko County, Nevada
Elko, Nevada micropolitan area
Ghost towns in Nevada